Tom O'Rourke may refer to:
 Tom O'Rourke (boxing manager) (1856–1936)
 Tom O'Rourke (baseball) (1865–1929), Major League Baseball catcher